Quillayute may refer to:

Quileute (tribe), or the Quillayute, a Native American people of western Washington state, United States
Quillayute, also known as Quileute, a Chimakuan language of the Quileute and Makah people of western Washington state in the United States; see Quileute language
Quillayute Airport, formerly known as Quillayute State Airport, a public airport in Clallam County, Washington, United States
Quillehuyte County, Washington, a defunct county (alternate spelling of Quillayute)
The Quillayute River, also called the Quileute River, a river on the Olympic Peninsula in western Washington state in the United States

See also
Quileute (disambiguation)